The Ariel Poems were two series of pamphlets that contained illustrated poems published by Faber and Gwyer and later by Faber and Faber.  The first series had 38 titles published between 1927 and 1931.  The second series, published in 1954, had 8 titles.

Each numbered pamphlet had an illustrated cover naming the author and illustrator. Four pages were sewn inside the cover.  The frontispiece had another illustration, usually multicolored.  Following that page was the poem.  Several authors and illustrators had multiple pamphlets.
 
The pamphlets in the first series, in order, are as follows:
 Yuletide in a Younger World by Thomas Hardy, drawings by Albert Rutherston
 The Linnet's Nest by Henry Newbolt, drawings by Ralph Keene
 The Wonder Night by Laurence Binyon, drawings by Barnett Freedman
 Alone by Walter de la Mare, wood engravings by Blair Hughes-Stanton
 Gloria in Profundis by G. K. Chesterton, wood engravings by Eric Gill 
 The Early Whistler by Wilfred Gibson, drawings by John Nash
 Nativity by Siegfried Sassoon, designs by Paul Nash
 Journey of the Magi by T. S. Eliot, drawings by E. McKnight Kauffer (August 1927)
 The Chanty of the Nona, poem and drawings by Hilaire Belloc
 Moss and Feather by W. H. Davies, illustrated by Sir William Nicholson
 Self to Self by Walter de la Mare, wood engravings by Blair Hughes-Stanton
 Troy by Humbert Wolfe, drawings by Charles Ricketts
 The Winter Solstice by Harold Monro, drawings by David Jones
 To My Mother by Siegfried Sassoon, drawings by Stephen Tennant
 Popular Song by Edith Sitwell, designs by Edward Bawden
 A Song for Simeon by T. S. Eliot, drawings by E. McKnight Kauffer (September 1928)
 Winter Nights, a reminiscence by Edmund Blunden, drawings by Albert Rutherston
 Three Things by W. B. Yeats, drawings by Gilbert Spencer
 Dark Weeping by "AE", designs by Paul Nash
 A Snowdrop by Walter de la Mare, drawings by Claudia Guercio
 Ubi Ecclesia by G. K. Chesterton, drawings by Diana Murphy
 The Outcast by James Stephens, drawings by Althea Willoughby
 Animula by T. S. Eliot, wood engravings by Gertrude Hermes (October 1929)
 Inscription on a Fountain-Head by Peter Quennell, drawings by Albert Rutherston
 The Grave of Arthur by G. K. Chesterton, drawings by Celia Fiennes
 Elm Angel by Harold Monro, wood engravings by Eric Ravilious
 In Sicily by Siegfried Sassoon, drawings by Stephen Tennant
 The Triumph of the Machine by D. H. Lawrence, drawings by Althea Willoughby
 Marina by T. S. Eliot, drawings by E. McKnight Kauffer (September 1930)
 The Gum Trees by Roy Campbell, drawings by David Jones
 News by Walter de la Mare, drawings by Barnett Freedman
 A Child is Born by Henry Newbolt, drawings by Althea Willoughby
 To Lucy by Walter de la Mare, drawings by Albert Rutherston
 To the Red Rose by Siegfried Sassoon, drawings by Stephen Tennant 
 Triumphal March by T. S. Eliot, drawings by E. McKnight Kauffer (October 1931)
 Jane Barston 1719-1746 by Edith Sitwell, drawings by R. A. Davies
 Invitation To Cast Out Care by Vita Sackville-West, drawings by Graham Sutherland
 Choosing A Mast by Roy Campbell, drawings by Barnett Freedman

The pamphlets in the second series are as follows:
 The Cultivation of Christmas Trees by T. S. Eliot, drawings by David Jones
 Mountains by W.H. Auden, drawings by Edward Bawden
 Christmas Eve by C. Day-Lewis, drawings by Edward Ardizzone
 Nativity by Roy Campbell, drawings by James Sellars
 The Other Wing by Louis MacNeice, drawings by Michael Ayrton
 Sirmione Peninsula by Stephen Sender, drawings by Lynton Lamb
 Prometheus by Edwin Muir, drawings by John Piper
 The Winnowing Dream by Walter de la Mare, drawings by Robin Jaques

See also
T. S. Eliot's Ariel poems

References

External sources

 This contains cover and frontispiece illustrations for poems 1-19.
 This contains cover and frontispiece illustrations for poems 20-38.

Pamphlets
Faber and Faber books